John David Kast (December 28, 1824 - February 10, 1900) was a member of the Wisconsin State Assembly.

Biography
Kast was born on December 28, 1824, in Rosenberg, German Empire. He served in the German Federal Army, at least at one point, as an orderly sergeant. Later, Kast settled in Waupaca County, Wisconsin, in 1861 and Shawano, Wisconsin, in 1874. Kast was an Episcopalian and worked as a miller. He died on February 10, 1900.

Assembly career
Kast was elected to the Assembly in 1876. He was a Republican.

References

External links

RootsWeb

People from the Grand Duchy of Baden
People from Waupaca County, Wisconsin
People from Shawano, Wisconsin
Republican Party members of the Wisconsin State Assembly
19th-century German military personnel
Millers
1824 births
1900 deaths
Burials in Wisconsin
19th-century American politicians